Indarti Issolina (born 10 February 1976) is a retired badminton player from Indonesia who specialized in doubles events. She married her compatriot in Indonesia national team, Wahyu Agung Setiawan, in June 2001.

Achievements

World Cup 
Women's doubles

Asian Championships 
Women's doubles

Asian Cup 
Women's doubles

Mixed doubles

Southeast Asian Games 
Women's doubles

World Junior Championships 
Girls' doubles

IBF World Grand Prix 
The World Badminton Grand Prix has been sanctioned by the International Badminton Federation from 1983 to 2006.

Women's doubles

 IBF Grand Prix tournament
 IBF Grand Prix Finals tournament

IBF International 
Women's doubles

Mixed doubles

References

External links 
 

1976 births
Living people
People from Banyumas Regency
Sportspeople from Central Java
Indonesian female badminton players
Badminton players at the 1998 Asian Games
Asian Games bronze medalists for Indonesia
Asian Games medalists in badminton
Medalists at the 1998 Asian Games
Competitors at the 1997 Southeast Asian Games
Competitors at the 1999 Southeast Asian Games
Southeast Asian Games gold medalists for Indonesia
Southeast Asian Games silver medalists for Indonesia
Southeast Asian Games medalists in badminton
20th-century Indonesian women
21st-century Indonesian women